TD Tower is an office tower in Edmonton, Alberta, Canada. It stands at 117 metres (384 feet) or 29 storeys tall and was completed in 1976. It was designed by Skidmore, Owings and Merrill LLP and is connected to the Edmonton City Centre retail complex. Tenants in the building include TD Bank Financial Group, PricewaterhouseCoopers, Randhawa Group of Companies, Chomicki Baril Mah LLP, McCuaig Desrochers LLP, Pennock Acheson Nielsen Devaney Chartered Accountants and Cushman & Wakefield Edmonton.

See also
List of tallest buildings in Edmonton

External links
 TD Tower - Oxford Leasing
 TD Tower Emporis profile

Office buildings completed in 1976
Bank buildings in Canada
Skyscraper office buildings in Canada
Skyscrapers in Edmonton
Skidmore, Owings & Merrill buildings
Toronto-Dominion Bank
Oxford Properties
Towers in Alberta
1976 establishments in Alberta